Egolf is a surname. Notable people with the surname include:

 Allan Egolf, politician
 Brian Egolf, politician
 Gretchen Egolf (born 1973), American actress
 Tristan Egolf (1971–2005), American novelist

See also
 eGolf Professional Tour
 Volkswagen eGolf, vehicle